In Gallo-Roman religion, Robor or Roboris was a god invoked alongside the genius loci on a single inscription found in Angoulême.

See more

Connected pages 
 Celtic polytheism
 Genius loci

External links 
 Robur in celtnet

References 

Gaulish gods
Nature gods
Angoulême